Prolita jubata is a moth of the family Gelechiidae. It was described by Ronald W. Hodges in 1966. It is found in North America, where it has been recorded from Washington, California, Colorado, Idaho, Montana and Utah.

The wingspan is 16–20 mm. The forewings are pale buff with darker brown and black markings. The hindwings are fuscous.

The larvae feed on Chrysothamnus viscidiflorus.

References

Moths described in 1966
Prolita